Troodos may refer to

Troodos Mountains, Cyprus
RAF Troodos, Royal Air Force signals station in the Troodos Mountains
, a Cypriot coaster in service 1947–52